Trachydoras steindachneri is a species of thorny catfish native to the Amazon basin of Bolivia, Brazil, Colombia, Ecuador and Peru.  This species grows to a length of  SL.

References 
 

Doradidae
Fish of Bolivia
Freshwater fish of Brazil
Freshwater fish of Colombia
Freshwater fish of Ecuador
Freshwater fish of Peru
Fish of the Amazon basin
Fish described in 1897